Mohre is a 1987 Indian Hindi movie directed by Raghuveer Kul. It starred Nana Patekar, Madhuri Dixit in lead roles. The pair later worked together in Vinod Chopra's Parinda and his own directorial debut, Prahaar. This film also starred Sadashiv Amrapurkar, Anupam Kher among others.

Plot
Abdul is a truck driver plagued with severe alcoholism and depression that causes him to want to end his life. One day another truck driver shows him a newspaper advertisement that offers help for suicide-ridden youth. Abdul decides to try them out and travels all the way to the countryside. Once there he is joined by four other youths, including a printing press proof-reader, Prakash Raikar; a young woman, Maya, who had been molested and hates men, as well as two other males, which include Sunil, who is gay. They meet with the person who placed the advertisement, a wheelchair-using former Indian Army Major Vishwas Sawant and his assistant, Vasu Mudaliar. The two are escaped convicts by the names of Jagga and Badri, that seek their patient's deaths.

Cast 
Nana Patekar as Abdul
Madhuri Dixit as Maya
Sadashiv Amrapurkar as Badrinath Chawla "Badri" / Vasu Mudaliar
Anupam Kher as Jagmohan Sharma "Jagga" / Major Vishwas Sawant
Aloknath as Father Braganza
Nilu Phule as Social Worker
Shreechand Makhija as Mr. Makhija
K. K. Raina as Prakash Raikar
Jayshree T. as Courtesan

Soundtrack

External links

1980s Hindi-language films
1988 films